KUNX (1400 AM) is a commercial radio station that is licensed to Santa Paula, California and serves the Ventura County, California area. The station broadcasts in the Spanish language, carrying a regional Mexican music format branded as "Radio Bronco 1400 AM & 102.5 FM". KUNX is owned by Gold Coast Broadcasting LLC. The station is rebroadcast on FM translator station K273CT (102.5 MHz) in Oxnard, California.

History
The station first signed on in 1948 as KSPA. In August 1966, station owner Franklin James sold KSPA to Rancho Broadcasting, owned by television engineer William F. Wallace, for $120,000. The following year, the station changed its call sign to KQIQ and adopted a country music format, later switching to top 40. In January 1974, the station changed its call letters to KAAP, flipping to an all-news format by the end of 1975. Rancho Broadcasting signed on an FM sister station,  (96.7 FM), in 1976. The company sold  for $1.2 million in late 1980.

During the 1990s, the station was known as KKZZ and broadcast an adult standards format.

In February 2013, KKZZ began airing Radio Fórmula, a Mexican news/talk radio network. In March 2017, it added an FM translator station at the 102.5 FM frequency. In May 2017, KUNX flipped to a regional Mexican music format with the moniker and the brand name "La Super X". On September 1, 2017, the station adopted the "Radio Bronco" branding.

References

External links
FCC History Cards for KUNX

UNX
UNX
Radio stations established in 1948
1948 establishments in California